The 2018 Liberian First Division League is the 44th season of the Liberian Premier League, the Liberian professional league for association football clubs, since the league's establishment in 1956.

After much delay, the season started on 27 August 2018. A total of 12 teams will participate, and they will be divided into two groups of six teams.

Group stage

Group A

Group B

Final
[Oct 17, Antoinette Tubman Stadium, Monrovia]

Barrack Young Controllers 2-2 LPRC Oilers               [aet, 4-2 pen]

See also
2018 Liberian FA Cup

References

Football competitions in Liberia
2017–18 in African association football leagues
2018 in Liberian sport